Natalia Ivanova (born 11 December 1979) is a Kazakhstani former footballer who played as a defender. She has been a member of the Kazakhstan women's national team.

References

1979 births
Living people
Women's association football defenders
Kazakhstani women's footballers
Kazakhstan women's international footballers
BIIK Kazygurt players
CSHVSM-Kairat players
Universitet Vitebsk players
Expatriate women's footballers in Belarus
Kazakhstani people of Russian descent